The 1955–56 SK Rapid Wien season was the 58th season in club history.

Squad

Squad and statistics

Squad statistics

Fixtures and results

League

European Cup

Mitropa Cup

References

1955-56 Rapid Wien Season
Rapid
Austrian football championship-winning seasons